Moinabad (also Romanized as Mo‘īnābād) is a village in Jangal Rural District, in the Central District of Fasa County, Fars Province, Iran. At the 2006 census, its population was 73, in 21 families.

References 

Populated places in Fasa County